Chin Pao San (also Jinbaoshan, Jiongbaoshan ) is a private cemetery located on a mountainside in Jinshan District, New Taipei, Taiwan. The site overlooks the Ju Ming Museum and, beyond it, the East China Sea.

Urns at Jinbaoshan are placed both indoors and outdoors. The site is accessible to visitors in wheelchairs.

Chin Pao San is famous for its abundant art. The grounds and interiors feature original works by a number of artists, including Ju Ming, the Taiwanese sculpture whose work represents the core of the collection at the adjacent museum. Sculpture at the site is modern in style and often symbolist in character. Many works are not overtly religious; of those that are, Buddhist and Taoist images are most numerous, though all major religions find representation at the site and one main building gives a prominent place to Christianity.

The most frequently visited gravesite belongs to Taiwanese singer Teresa Teng. Her memorial garden features a life-size statue and a large electronic keyboard set in the ground that can be played by visitors stepping on its keys.

See also
 List of tourist attractions in Taiwan

References

External links

 
 Chin Pao San web site 

Cemeteries in Taiwan
Geography of New Taipei
Tourist attractions in New Taipei
Sculpture gardens, trails and parks in Asia
Buildings and structures in New Taipei